Vladimir Ivanovich Markin (23 November 1956 – 12 October 2021) was a Russian journalist and politician. He served as Chairman of the Department for Interaction with Mass Media of the Investigative Committee of Russia from 2007 to 2016, the first person to hold the position following the Committee's founding. He also served as First Deputy Chairman of RusHydro from 2016 to 2019.

References

1956 births
2021 deaths
Russian journalists
Politicians  from Chelyabinsk
Writers from Chelyabinsk
Businesspeople from Chelyabinsk
Russian energy industry businesspeople
Burials in Troyekurovskoye Cemetery
Moscow State University alumni